Pender Early College High School, also known as PEC or PECHS, is a school in Burgaw, North Carolina, United States, created by the Early College High School Initiative, sponsored by the New Schools Project. Pender County Schools and Cape Fear Community College maintain the school, which is situated on the Burgaw Campus of Cape Fear Community College. It had its first graduating class in May 2010.

Dual enrollment
Students who enroll in Pender Early College High School are also enrolled in Cape Fear Community College. The curriculum lasts four to five years, and students gradually take college classes in place of their high school classes, until their junior year, when students should be taking all college classes. Upon completion of the program, students will graduate with both a high school diploma and an associate degree from Cape Fear Community College. Students are also required to complete 150 hours of civic engagement, four leadership development camps, a graduation project, an internship and a cumulative portfolio before graduation.

Classes
All classes offered at PECHS are either honors or college level.

High school classes include English I, II, III, and IV; journalism; integrated math I, II, III, and IV; earth/environmental science; biology; chemistry; civics and economics; United States history; and world history. All classes offered at Cape Fear Community College are open to PECHS students; these range from boat building to multi-variable calculus. PECHS also hosts special classes and seminars that vary by semester. These include yoga, documentary film, project citizenship and etiquette classes.

References

External links
 Pender Early College High School

Public high schools in North Carolina
Schools in Pender County, North Carolina
Educational institutions established in 2006
2006 establishments in North Carolina